El rey, Vicente Fernández is a Mexican biographical drama produced by Colombian network Caracol TV. The series aired first in Colombia on Caracol TV from 3 August 2022 to 16 September 2022. The series became available for streaming outside Colombia on Netflix on 14 September 2022. On Netflix the series has a total of 36 episodes.

Cast 
 Jaime Camil as Vicente Fernández
 Sebastian Dante as Young Vicente
 Sebastian García as Teen Vicente
 Kaled Acab as Child Vicente
 Marcela Guirado as María del Refugio "Cuquita"
 Regina Pavón as Young Cuquita
 Ishkra Zaval as Child Cuquita
 Enoc Leaño as Ramón
 Marissa Saavedra as Paula Gómez
 Raúl Sandoval as Felipe Arriaga
 Erick Chapa as Tico Mendoza
 Florencia Ríos as Refugios Fernández
 Seidy Berchat as Teen Refugios
 Casandra Iturralde as Child Refugios
 Ana Paula Capetillo as Teresa Fernández
 Valentina Buzurro as Teen Teresa
 Camila Núñez as Child Teresa
 Camila Rojas as Janeth
 Rubén Zamora as Enrique Landes
 Gaby Espino as Verónica Landín
 Sara Montalvo as Matilde
 Nini Pavón as Doña Zuy
 Alexa Martín as Rosa
 Mauricio Pimentel as La Muerte
 Esteban Soberanes as Alberto Ríos

Guest stars 

 Odiseo Bichir as Pastor Miguel
 Carlos Corona as Palermo El Gordo
 Roberto Tello as Don Pascual
 Yigael Yadin as El Chato
 Aroa Gimeno as Maritza
 Emilio Hernández as Chuy
 Valeria Santaella as Dolores
 Pilar Santacruz as Gloria
 Karla Gaytán as Child Gloria
 Juan Pablo Hermidia as Gustavo
 Juan Morales as Porfirio
 Checo Perezcuadra as Raúl Abarca
 Waldo Facco as Duran
 Jerónimo Victoria as Palafox El Malandrín
 Angelo Enciso as Marcelo
 Elissa Garibay as Socorro
 Rodrigo Magaña as David
 Fabián Pazzo as Acosta
 Alejandro Morales as Ismael
 Fernando Sansores as Dr. Camacho
 Salvador Álvarez as Humberto
 Javier de la Vega as Israel Camacho
 Carlos Fonseca as Mario Cervera
 Victor Civeira as Pastor Benavides
 Lucia Tinajero as Emilia
 David Muri as Genaro Rey
 Alejandro Cuétara as Hinestroza
 Beto Ruelas as Antonio Vargas
 Pablo García as Oscar
 Jaime Vega as Reutilio
 Argenis Aldrete as Dr. Ramírez
 Acoyani Chacón as Juan La Bestia
 Andrea Paz as Pachita
 Benjamín Martínez as Plinio
 Sofía Garza as Lorena Cruz
 Ernesto Alvares as Antua Lazo
 Giovanni Carlo as Ángel Encargado
 Alieth Vargas as Mari
 Juanita Londoño as Alejandra
 Christian de Dios as Guillermo
 Gabo Anguiano as Simón
 Rodrigo Olguin as Tulio
 Santiago Rojas as Martín
 Alfredo Herrera as Joan El Felino
 Gregorio Urkijo as young Junior
 Ruy Gaytán as child Junior
 Walter Kapellas as Nemesio
 Sergio Gutiérrez as Tiberio
 Adriana Llabrés as Graciela
 Antonio Zúñiga as Tomás
 Alejandro Bracho as Eustaquio
 Armando Tapia as Hilario
 Sofía Blanchet as Abigail
 Geraldine Galván as Elsa
 Enrique Chi as Emeterio
 Ezequiel Cardenas as Javier
 Luis Curiel as Jimeno
 Karla Esquivel as Patricia Sáenz
 Luisa Galindo as Raquel
 Fernando Becerril as Honorio Dalton
 Javier Gómez as Roberto
 Marcial Casale as Don Yuyo
 América Valdéz as Tania Tejeda
 Luisa Galindo as Raquel
 Max Flores as Dr. Casillas
 Marco Antonio Zetina as Pablo
 Josué Guerra as Marco Dalton
 Rodrigo Urquidi as Luis
 Ana Sofía Sánchez as Tata
 María Fernanda García as Perla
 Vladimir Burciaga as Chepe Meneses
 Cirilo Santiago as Maldonado
 Natalia Jiménez as Cordelia Vélez
 Pepe Navarrete as Renato Valdez
 Fermín Martínez as Belisario Montenegro
 Ricardo Galina as Alejandro
 Lukas Urkijo as Gerardo
 Harding Junior as José
 Emilio Caballero as Julio
 Sergio Maya as Paco
 Mara López as Katia La Chava
 Ricardo Galina as Alejandro

Episodes

Production

Development 
On 20 September 2021, El Rey, Vicente Fernández was ordered to series by Caracol Televisión and Netflix. The series had been in development since December 2019. It is the version authorized by Vicente Fernández's family, unlike El último rey, an unauthorized version by TelevisaUnivision, which the family publicly condemned. A total of 36 episodes have been confirmed.

Casting 
On 30 September 2021, it was announced that Jaime Camil would portray Vicente Fernández. On 27 January 2022, Marcela Guirado was announced in the role of Doña Cuquita, Vicente Fernández's wife.

Filming 
Filming began on 20 September 2021 in Hidalgo, Mexico, and concluded in March 2022.

Release 
In Colombia, the series premiered on 3 August 2022, on Caracol Televisión. Internationally, the series began streaming on Netflix on 14 September 2022.

Reception

Television ratings

Awards and nominations

References

External links 
 
 

2020s Mexican drama television series
2022 Mexican television series debuts
2022 Colombian television series endings
Spanish-language television shows
Hispanic and Latino American television
Television series based on singers and musicians
Television series set in the 1940s
Television series set in the 1950s
Television series set in the 1960s
Television series set in the 1970s
Television series set in the 1980s
Television series set in the 1990s
Television shows set in Mexico